The Minewater Project, based in Heerlen and other areas, aims to demonstrate how the geothermal energy stored by mine water can be used as a safe and ecological way to heat buildings.

Aims
The aims of the pilot projects are:
to supply new, 'green' energy from old mines
regeneration, including possible opportunities for new jobs
an environmental solution in place of an environmental problem

Funding
The Minewater Project is supported by a grant from the European Union under the framework of the Interreg IIIB NWE Programme. There are five project partners and numerous European observers who are contributing their expertise and knowledge.

The total costs of the project amount to €20 million to which Interreg IIIB is contributing 48%.
The Project began work in March 2005, and it will run until June 2008.

Heerlen
The scheme in Heerlen will be located at two areas of redevelopment in the town at Heerlerheide Centrum and Stadpark Oranje Nassau. These sites are 3.5 km apart situated to the north of the town and in the centre of the town, respectively. The two sites will part of one system that will be able to both heat and cool buildings.

Heerlerheide

Two wells will be drilled in Heerlerheide to a depth of 825 metres. Nearly a kilometre beneath the town water can be found at about 35 °C, like a warm bath. This task will not be easy and is likely to require 350 hours of continuous drilling.  By the time the drilling is complete and tests carried out, engineers will know a lot more exact detail about the water temperature and quality, and the cost of using it.

Stadpark Oranje Nassau

At Stadpark Oranje Nassau the drilling does not need to be so deep, because the mineshafts themselves are not so deep. An intermediate well will be drilled to 500 metres and also two shallow 250 metre wells.

The shallow wells will receive the water from Heelerheide that has meanwhile been used for heating buildings. The heat will have been used up, so the water will fill the shallow wells at a temperature of 17 °C. This means that it can also be useful for cooling.

References

Geothermal power stations
Heerlen
Proposed energy infrastructure in the Netherlands
Renewable energy in the Netherlands
Proposed power stations in the Netherlands